Stefano Ticci (born 13 May 1962) is an Italian bobsledder who competed in the early 1990s. Competing in four Winter Olympics, he won a bronze medal in the two-man event at Lillehammer in 1994.

Stefano is also the cousin of world-renowned journalist Alberto Riva.

References

External links
Bobsleigh two-man Olympic medalists 1932-56 and since 1964
DatabaseOlympics.com profile

1962 births
Bobsledders at the 1984 Winter Olympics
Bobsledders at the 1988 Winter Olympics
Bobsledders at the 1992 Winter Olympics
Bobsledders at the 1994 Winter Olympics
Living people
Italian male bobsledders
Olympic bobsledders of Italy
Olympic medalists in bobsleigh
Medalists at the 1994 Winter Olympics
Olympic bronze medalists for Italy
Bobsledders of Fiamme Oro
People from Forte dei Marmi
Sportspeople from the Province of Lucca